Charles Edmund Cullen (born February 22, 1960) is an American serial killer. Cullen, a nurse, murdered dozens – possibly hundreds – of patients during a 16-year career spanning several New Jersey medical centers, until being arrested in 2003. He confessed to committing as many as 40 murders, at least 29 of which have been confirmed, though interviews with police, psychiatrists and journalists suggest he committed many more.

Early life 
Charles Cullen was born on February 22, 1960, in West Orange, New Jersey. He was raised in a working-class Catholic family, the youngest of eight children. His father Edmond, a bus driver, died on September 17, 1960, when Charles was seven months old. Cullen later described his childhood as "miserable" and claimed to have been constantly bullied by his schoolmates and sisters' boyfriends. When he was aged nine, he made the first of many suicide attempts by drinking chemicals from a chemistry set.

Cullen's mother, Florence Cullen, was born in England and emigrated to the US after World War II. She was killed in a car accident on December 6, 1977, at the age of 55, when Cullen was in his senior year of high school. Cullen recalled his mother's death as being "devastating" and described being upset that the hospital did not immediately inform him of her death and cremated her body instead of returning it.

The following year, Cullen graduated from West Orange High School and enlisted in the United States Navy. He served aboard the submarine USS Woodrow Wilson. He successfully passed basic training and the rigorous psychological examinations required for submarine crews, who were expected to spend as long as two months at a time being submerged in a cramped vessel. Cullen rose to the rank of petty officer second class as part of the team that operated the vessel's Poseidon missiles. He did not fit in during his time in the Navy and was hazed and bullied by his fellow crewmen.

A year into his service, Cullen's leading petty officer aboard Woodrow Wilson discovered him seated at the missile controls wearing a surgical mask, gloves and scrubs rather than his uniform. Cullen was disciplined for that action but never explained why he had dressed that way. The Navy reassigned Cullen to a lower-pressure job on the supply ship USS Canopus. He attempted suicide and was committed to the Navy psychiatric ward several times over the subsequent few years. Cullen received a medical discharge from the Navy in 1984 for undisclosed reasons.

Shortly after his discharge, Cullen enrolled at Mountainside Hospital's nursing school in Montclair, New Jersey. Elected president of his nursing class, he graduated in 1986 and started work at the burn unit of Saint Barnabas Medical Center in Livingston, New Jersey.

Meanwhile, Cullen met and married Adrianne Baum in 1987. Their daughter, the first of two girls, was born later that year. However, Cullen's wife became increasingly disturbed at his unusual behavior and his abuse of the family dogs. In 1993, she filed a restraining order against him based on her fear that he might endanger her and their two children. She claimed that Cullen had spiked people's drinks with lighter fluid, burned his daughter's books, and left his daughters with a babysitter for a week. Cullen denied these claims, saying that his wife was exaggerating. Nevertheless, she continued to insist that Cullen was mentally ill.

Murders 

The first murders to which Cullen later confessed occurred at Saint Barnabas. On June 11, 1988, he administered a lethal overdose of intravenous medication to a patient. Cullen eventually admitted to killing several other patients at Saint Barnabas, including an AIDS patient who died after he had been given an overdose of insulin. Cullen left Saint Barnabas in January 1992 when the hospital authorities began investigating the contaminated IV bags. The investigation later determined that Cullen had most likely been responsible, resulting in dozens of patient deaths at the hospital.

One month after leaving Saint Barnabas, Cullen took a job at Warren Hospital in Phillipsburg, New Jersey, where he murdered three elderly women with overdoses of the heart medication digoxin. His final victim said that a "sneaky male nurse" had injected her as she slept. However, family members and healthcare providers at the hospital dismissed her comments as unfounded.

The following year, Cullen moved into a basement apartment in Phillipsburg after a contentious divorce from his wife. Cullen later claimed that he had wanted to quit nursing in 1993, but the court-ordered child support payments forced him to continue working. In March 1993, Cullen broke into a co-worker's home while she and her young son slept, but he left without waking them. He then began stalking the woman, who filed a police report against him. Cullen subsequently pleaded guilty to trespassing and received one year of probation. The day after his arrest, he made another suicide attempt.

Cullen took two months off from work and was treated for depression in two psychiatric facilities. However, he attempted suicide twice more by the end of the year. That September, a 91-year-old cancer patient at Warren Hospital reported that Cullen, who was not her assigned nurse, had come into her room and injected her with a needle. She died the next day. Her son protested that her death was not natural, and the hospital administered a lie detector test to Cullen and several other nurses, which he passed. Cullen continued to work at Warren until the following spring.

Cullen began a three-year stint in the intensive care unit of Hunterdon Medical Center in Flemington, New Jersey. He claimed that he did not harm anyone during the first two years at Hunterdon. However, hospital records for that period had been destroyed at the time of his arrest in 2003. Cullen admitted to murdering five patients between January and September 1996, again with overdoses of digoxin. He then found work at Morristown Memorial Hospital but was soon fired for poor performance. Cullen remained unemployed for six months and stopped making child support payments. After seeking treatment for depression in the Warren Hospital emergency room, he was briefly admitted to a psychiatric facility.

In February 1998, Cullen was hired by the Liberty Nursing and Rehabilitation Center in Allentown, Pennsylvania, where he staffed a ward of respirator-dependent patients. There he was accused of giving patients drugs at unscheduled times. He was fired after being seen entering a patient's room with syringes in his hand, an encounter that left the patient with a broken arm. Cullen caused a patient's death at Liberty Hospital, which was blamed on another nurse. After leaving Liberty, Cullen was employed at Easton Hospital from November 1998 to March 1999. On December 30, 1998, he murdered yet another patient. A coroner's blood test showed lethal amounts of digoxin in the patient's blood but an internal investigation within Easton Hospital was inconclusive; evidence did not definitively point to Cullen as the murderer.

Even with his history of mental instability and the number of deaths during his employment at various hospitals, Cullen continued to find work because of a national shortage of nurses. Additionally, no reporting mechanism yet existed to identify nurses with mental health or employment problems. Liability concerns made hospitals unwilling to take significant action against Cullen.

In March 1999, Cullen took a job at the burn unit of Allentown's Lehigh Valley Hospital–Cedar Crest, where he murdered one patient and attempted to murder another. One month later, he voluntarily resigned from Lehigh Valley Hospital and took a job working in the cardiac care unit at St. Luke's Hospital in Bethlehem, Pennsylvania. During the subsequent three years, Cullen murdered at least five patients and is known to have attempted to kill two more. On January 11, 2000, he once again attempted suicide by lighting a charcoal grill in his bathtub and hoped to succumb to carbon monoxide poisoning. His neighbors smelled smoke and called the fire department and police. Cullen was taken to a hospital and a psychiatric facility but returned home the following day.

No one suspected Cullen was murdering patients at St. Luke's until a co-worker found medication vials in a disposal bin. The drugs were not valuable outside the hospital, and since they were not used in recreational drug use, the theft was highly unusual. An investigation showed that Cullen had taken the medication. He was offered a deal by St. Luke's to resign and be given a neutral recommendation, or to be fired. He resigned and was escorted from the building in June 2002. Seven of his coworkers at St. Luke's later alerted the Lehigh County district attorney of their suspicions that he had used drugs to kill patients. Investigators never looked into Cullen's past and the case was dropped nine months later for lack of evidence.

In September 2002, Cullen began working in the critical care unit of the Somerset Medical Center in Somerville, New Jersey. He began dating a local woman around then, but his depression worsened. Cullen had killed at least thirteen patients and attempted to kill at least one more by mid-2003, using digoxin, insulin, and epinephrine. On June 18, 2003, he unsuccessfully attempted to murder Somerset patient Philip Gregor, who was later discharged and died six months later of natural causes.

Somerset began to notice Cullen's wrongdoing when he accessed the rooms and computerized records of patients to whom he was not assigned. The hospital's computerized drug-dispensing cabinets showed that he was requesting medications that his patients had not been prescribed. His drug requests included many orders that were immediately canceled and many requests within minutes of one another. In July 2003, the executive director of the New Jersey Poison Information and Education System warned Somerset officials that at least four suspicious overdoses indicated the possibility that an employee was killing patients. By October Cullen had killed at least five more patients and attempted to kill another.

When a patient in Somerset died of low blood sugar in October 2003, the hospital alerted the New Jersey State Police. That patient was Cullen's final victim. State officials castigated the hospital for failing to report a nonfatal insulin overdose administered by Cullen in August. An investigation into his employment history revealed past suspicions about his involvement in patient deaths. Somerset fired Cullen on October 31, 2003, ostensibly for lying on his job application. The nurse Amy Loughren alerted the police after she had become alarmed about Cullen's records of accessing drugs and his links to patient deaths. Police kept him under surveillance for several weeks until they had finished their investigation. Investigators assigned Loughren to visit Cullen after work hours and to talk with him while she wore a wire. With that evidence, police had produced enough probable cause for arrest.

Arrest and sentencing 
Cullen was arrested at a restaurant on December 12, 2003, and charged with one count of murder and one count of attempted murder. On December 14, he admitted to the homicide detectives Dan Baldwin and Tim Braun that he had murdered Fr. Florian Gall and had attempted to murder Jin Kyung Han, both of whom were patients at Somerset. In addition, Cullen told the detectives that he had murdered as many as 40 patients over his 16-year career. In April 2004, Cullen pleaded guilty before Judge Paul W. Armstrong in a New Jersey court to killing 13 patients and to attempting to kill two others by lethal injection while he was employed at Somerset.

As part of his plea agreement, Cullen promised to cooperate with authorities if they did not seek the death penalty for his crimes. A month later, he pleaded guilty to the murder of three more patients in New Jersey. In November 2004, Cullen pleaded guilty in an Allentown court to killing six patients and trying to kill three others. He repeatedly interrupted the proceedings by taunting the judge with the chant, "Your Honor, you need to step down." Cullen was ordered to be restrained and gagged.

On March 2, 2006, Cullen was sentenced to eleven consecutive life sentences by Judge Armstrong in New Jersey, and he is not eligible for parole until June 10, 2403. Currently, he is held at New Jersey State Prison in Trenton, New Jersey. On March 10, 2006, Cullen was brought into the courtroom of Lehigh County (Pennsylvania)  President (Presiding Judge) Judge William H. Platt for a sentencing hearing. Cullen, upset with the judge, kept repeating, "Your Honor, you need to step down" for thirty minutes until Platt had Cullen gagged with cloth and duct tape. Even after being gagged, Cullen continued to try to repeat the phrase. In that hearing, Platt gave him an additional six life sentences. As part of his plea agreement, Cullen has been working with law enforcement officials to identify additional victims.

Motives 
Cullen stated that he had overdosed patients to spare them from being seen going into cardiac or respiratory arrest and being listed as a Code Blue emergency. He told detectives that he could not bear to witness or to hear about attempts at saving a victim's life. Cullen also stated that he gave patients overdoses so that he could end their suffering and prevent hospital personnel from dehumanizing them. However, not all of his victims were terminal patients. Some, like Gall, had been expected to recover before Cullen killed them. The nurse Lynn Tester described many of the victims as "people on the mend" in a police interview.

Instead of using common painkillers and stimulants, access to which was strictly regulated by hospitals because of their value as street drugs, Cullen chose drugs such as digoxin and insulin, which had little use outside of a hospital setting and were less likely to attract attention.

Investigators stated that Cullen may have caused patients to suffer but did not realize it, which contradicted his claims of wanting to save patients. Similarly, Cullen told investigators that although he often observed patients' suffering for several days, the decision to commit each murder was performed on impulse. Cullen told detectives in December 2003 that he lived most of his life in a fog and that he had blacked out memories of murdering most of his victims. He said that he could not recall how many he killed or why he had chosen them. In some cases, Cullen adamantly denied committing any murders at a given facility. However, after reviewing medical records, he admitted that he had been involved in patient deaths.

Legal impact 
Cullen moved from facility to facility undetected mainly because of the lack of requirements to report suspicious behavior by medical workers and inadequate legal obligations on employers. New Jersey and Pennsylvania, like most other states, required health care facilities to report suspicious deaths only in the most egregious cases, and the penalties for failing to report incidents were minor. Also, many states did not give investigators the legal authority to discover workers' previous employers.

Employers feared investigating incidents or giving a bad employment reference for fear of such actions triggering lawsuits. According to detectives and Cullen himself, several hospitals suspected him of harming or killing patients but failed to take appropriate legal actions. After Cullen's criminal conviction, many of the hospitals at which he had worked were sued by the families of his victims. The files and settlements against the New Jersey hospitals, all of which were settled out of court, are sealed.

In some cases, individual workers took it upon themselves informally to try to prevent Cullen from being hired or to have him terminated. Some contacted nearby hospitals in secret or quietly spoke to their superiors to alert them not to hire Cullen. When Cullen took a job at Sacred Heart Hospital, in Allentown, in June 2001, a nurse who had heard rumors about him at Easton Hospital advised her coworkers. The nurses threatened to quit en masse if Cullen was not immediately dismissed, which he was.

Prompted by the Cullen case, Pennsylvania, New Jersey, and 35 other states adopted new laws which encourage employers to give honest appraisals of workers' job performance and provide legal protections for reporting medical errors. The New Jersey laws, in particular, formed the model other states would follow. Firstly, the 2004 Patient Safety Act increased hospitals' responsibility for reporting "serious preventable adverse events". The 2005 Enhancement Act, a supplement to the Patient Safety Act, required hospitals to report certain details on their employees to the New Jersey Division of Consumer Affairs and mandated that complaints and disciplinary records relating to patient care be kept for at least seven years.

In popular culture 
The 2008 direct-to-video film Killer Nurse, written and directed by Ulli Lommel, was loosely based on Cullen.

On June 25, 2020, the British television channel Sky Crime aired the documentary Charles Cullen – Killing for Kindness. The UK True Crime producers Woodcut Mediastory produced the story of the nurse who confessed to murdering up to 40 patients during his 16-year career.

The film The Good Nurse, adapted from Charles Graeber's non-fiction book The Good Nurse: A True Story of Medicine, Madness, and Murder, was released on Netflix on October 26, 2022. Eddie Redmayne portrays Cullen and Jessica Chastain portrays coworker Amy Loughren, a nurse who helped implicate Cullen and assisted detectives by talking with Cullen after work hours while she wore a wire.

Capturing the Killer Nurse is a 2022 documentary film about the convicted serial killer Charles Cullen. It includes interviews with Cullen, his co-workers, detectives and Amy Loughren, a nurse who assisted the detectives. There are interviews with family members of the victims, true crime author Charles Graeber and audio from Cullen himself.  The film also takes a look at a U.S. healthcare system saying that profit motives of private healthcare helped Charles continue to commit his crimes without consequences. It began streaming on Netflix on November 11, 2022.

See also 

 Niels Hogel
 Donald Harvey
 Orville Majors
 Reta Mays
 Harold Shipman
 Arnfinn Nesset
 Elizabeth Wettlaufer
 List of serial killers in the United States
 List of serial killers by number of victims

References 

1960 births
1988 murders in the United States
20th-century American criminals
21st-century American criminals
American nurses
American people convicted of murder
American prisoners sentenced to life imprisonment
American serial killers
Criminals from New Jersey
Criminals from Pennsylvania
Living people
Male nurses
Male serial killers
Medical serial killers
People convicted of murder by New Jersey
People convicted of murder by Pennsylvania
People from West Orange, New Jersey
Prisoners sentenced to life imprisonment by New Jersey
Prisoners sentenced to life imprisonment by Pennsylvania
Nurses convicted of killing patients
Organ transplant donors
Poisoners
Submariners
United States Navy sailors
West Orange High School (New Jersey) alumni